The 91st Academy Awards ceremony, presented by the Academy of Motion Picture Arts and Sciences (AMPAS), honored the best films of 2018 and took place on February 24, 2019, at the Dolby Theatre in Hollywood, Los Angeles. During the ceremony, AMPAS presented Academy Awards (commonly referred to as Oscars) in 24 categories. The ceremony was televised in the United States by the American Broadcasting Company (ABC) and was produced by Donna Gigliotti and Glenn Weiss, with Weiss also serving as director. This was the first telecast to have no host since the 61st ceremony held in 1989.

In related events, the Academy held its 10th Annual Governors Awards ceremony at the Grand Ballroom of the Hollywood & Highland Center on November 18, 2018. The Academy Scientific and Technical Awards were presented by host David Oyelowo on February 9, 2019, in a ceremony at the Beverly Wilshire Hotel in Beverly Hills.

Green Book won three awards including Best Picture. Bohemian Rhapsody won the most awards of the night, with four awards, Black Panther and Roma won three awards, and Bao, BlacKkKlansman, The Favourite, First Man, Free Solo, If Beale Street Could Talk, Period. End of Sentence., Skin, Spider-Man: Into the Spider-Verse, A Star Is Born, and Vice won one. The telecast garnered 29.56 million viewers in the United States.

Winners and nominees 

The nominees for the 91st Academy Awards were announced on January 22, 2019, at 5:20 a.m. PST (13:20 UTC), at the Academy headquarters in Beverly Hills, by actors Kumail Nanjiani and Tracee Ellis Ross. The Favourite and Roma tied for the most nominations with ten each.

The winners were announced during the awards ceremony on February 24, 2019. For the second time since the expansion of the Best Picture nominee roster at the 82nd ceremony in 2010, every Best Picture nominee won at least one award. Roma became the fifth film nominated simultaneously for Best Picture and Best Foreign Language Film in the same year. Moreover, its ten nominations tied the film with 2000's Crouching Tiger, Hidden Dragon as the most nominated foreign language film. Alfonso Cuarón was the first person to win Best Director and Best Cinematography for the same film. Black Panther was the first superhero film to be nominated for Best Picture.

Best Supporting Actor winner Mahershala Ali became the second black performer to win multiple acting awards after Denzel Washington, who won Best Supporting Actor for 1989's Glory and Best Actor for 2001's Training Day, as well as the only black actor to win the same award twice for a Best Picture–winning film (after also winning for Best Supporting Actor for Moonlight in 2017). With her nominations in Best Actress and Best Original Song for A Star Is Born, Lady Gaga was the second person to receive acting and songwriting nominations for the same film after Mary J. Blige for 2017's Mudbound. Best Costume Design winner Ruth E. Carter and Best Production Design co-winner Hannah Beachler were the first Black winners in their respective categories and the first Black women to win in a non-acting category since Irene Cara, who won the category of Best Original Song for co-writing "Flashdance... What a Feeling" from 1983's Flashdance.

Awards
Winners are listed first, highlighted in boldface, and indicated with a double dagger.
{| class=wikitable
|-
| style="vertical-align:top; width:50%;"|

 Green Book – Jim Burke, Charles B. Wessler, Brian Currie, Peter Farrelly and Nick VallelongaBlack Panther – Kevin Feige
BlacKkKlansman – Sean McKittrick, Jason Blum, Raymond Mansfield, Jordan Peele and Spike Lee
 Bohemian Rhapsody – Graham King
 The Favourite – Ceci Dempsey, Ed Guiney, Lee Magiday and Yorgos Lanthimos
Roma – Gabriela Rodríguez and Alfonso Cuarón
A Star Is Born – Bill Gerber, Bradley Cooper and Lynette Howell Taylor
Vice – Dede Gardner, Jeremy Kleiner, Adam McKay and Kevin Messick
| style="vertical-align:top; width:50%;"|

 Alfonso Cuarón – Roma
 Spike Lee – BlacKkKlansman
 Paweł Pawlikowski – Cold War
 Yorgos Lanthimos – The Favourite
 Adam McKay – Vice
|-
| style="vertical-align:top; width:50%;"|

 Rami Malek – Bohemian Rhapsody as Freddie Mercury
Christian Bale – Vice as Dick Cheney
 Bradley Cooper – A Star Is Born as Jackson "Jack" Maine
 Willem Dafoe – At Eternity's Gate as Vincent van Gogh
Viggo Mortensen – Green Book as Tony Vallelonga
| style="vertical-align:top; width:50%;"|

  Olivia Colman – The Favourite as Queen Anne
 Yalitza Aparicio – Roma as Cleodegaria "Cleo" Gutierrez
 Glenn Close – The Wife as Joan Castleman
 Lady Gaga – A Star Is Born as Ally Maine
 Melissa McCarthy – Can You Ever Forgive Me? as Lee Israel
|-
| style="vertical-align:top; width:50%;"|

 Mahershala Ali – Green Book as Don Shirley
 Adam Driver – BlacKkKlansman as Philip "Flip" Zimmerman
 Sam Elliott – A Star Is Born as Bobby Maine
 Richard E. Grant – Can You Ever Forgive Me? as Jack Hock
 Sam Rockwell – Vice as George W. Bush
| style="vertical-align:top; width:50%;"|

Regina King – If Beale Street Could Talk as Sharon Rivers
Amy Adams – Vice as Lynne Cheney
Marina de Tavira – Roma as Sofía
Emma Stone – The Favourite as Abigail Masham
Rachel Weisz – The Favourite as Sarah Churchill
|-
| style="vertical-align:top; width:50%;" |

 Green Book – Nick Vallelonga, Brian Currie and Peter Farrelly The Favourite – Deborah Davis and Tony McNamara
 First Reformed – Paul Schrader
 Roma – Alfonso Cuarón
 Vice – Adam McKay
| style="vertical-align:top; width:50%;" |

 BlacKkKlansman – Charlie Wachtel, David Rabinowitz, Kevin Willmott and Spike Lee;  The Ballad of Buster Scruggs – Joel Coen and Ethan Coen; 
 Can You Ever Forgive Me? – Nicole Holofcener and Jeff Whitty; 
 If Beale Street Could Talk – Barry Jenkins; 
 A Star Is Born – Eric Roth, Bradley Cooper and Will Fetters; 
|-
| style="vertical-align:top; width:50%;"|

 Spider-Man: Into the Spider-Verse – Bob Persichetti, Peter Ramsey, Rodney Rothman, Phil Lord and Christopher Miller Incredibles 2 – Brad Bird, John Walker and Nicole Paradis Grindle
 Isle of Dogs – Wes Anderson, Scott Rudin, Steven Rales and Jeremy Dawson
 Mirai – Mamoru Hosoda and Yuichiro Saito
 Ralph Breaks the Internet – Rich Moore, Phil Johnston and Clark Spencer
| style="vertical-align:top; width:50%;"|

 Roma (Mexico) in Spanish and Mixtec – Directed by Alfonso Cuarón Capernaum (Lebanon) in Arabic – Directed by Nadine Labaki
 Cold War (Poland) in Polish and French – Directed by Paweł Pawlikowski
 Never Look Away (Germany) in German – Directed by Florian Henckel von Donnersmarck
 Shoplifters (Japan) in Japanese – Directed by Hirokazu Kore-eda
|-
| style="vertical-align:top; width:50%;"|

 Free Solo – Elizabeth Chai Vasarhelyi, Jimmy Chin, Evan Hayes and Shannon Dill Hale County This Morning, This Evening – RaMell Ross, Joslyn Barnes and Su Kim
 Minding the Gap – Bing Liu and Diane Quon
 Of Fathers and Sons – Talal Derki, Ansgar Frerich, Eva Kemme and Tobias N. Siebert
 RBG – Betsy West and Julie Cohen
| style="vertical-align:top; width:50%;"|

 Period. End of Sentence. – Rayka Zehtabchi and Melissa Berton Black Sheep – Ed Perkins and Jonathan Chinn
 End Game – Rob Epstein and Jeffrey Friedman
 Lifeboat – Skye Fitzgerald and Bryn Mooser
 A Night at the Garden – Marshall Curry
|-
| style="vertical-align:top; width:50%;"|

 Skin – Guy Nattiv and Jaime Ray Newman Detainment – Vincent Lambe and Darren Mahon
 Fauve – Jérémy Comte and Maria Gracia Turgeon
 Marguerite – Marianne Farley and Marie-Hélène Panisset
 Mother – Rodrigo Sorogoyen and María del Puy Alvarado
| style="vertical-align:top; width:50%;"|

 Bao – Domee Shi and Becky Neiman-Cobb Animal Behaviour – Alison Snowden and David Fine
 Late Afternoon – Louise Bagnall and Nuria González Blanco
 One Small Step – Andrew Chesworth and Bobby Pontillas
 Weekends – Trevor Jimenez
|-
| style="vertical-align:top; width:50%;"|

 Black Panther – Ludwig Göransson BlacKkKlansman – Terence Blanchard
 If Beale Street Could Talk – Nicholas Britell
 Isle of Dogs – Alexandre Desplat
 Mary Poppins Returns – Marc Shaiman
| style="vertical-align:top; width:50%;"|

 "Shallow" from A Star Is Born – Music and lyrics by Lady Gaga, Mark Ronson, Anthony Rossomando and Andrew Wyatt "All the Stars" from Black Panther – Music by Mark "Sounwave" Spears, Kendrick Lamar and Anthony "Top Dawg" Tiffith; lyrics by Kendrick Lamar, Anthony "Top Dawg" Tiffith and SZA
 "I'll Fight" from RBG – Music and lyrics by Diane Warren
 "The Place Where Lost Things Go" from Mary Poppins Returns – Music by Marc Shaiman; lyrics by Marc Shaiman and Scott Wittman
 "When a Cowboy Trades His Spurs for Wings" from The Ballad of Buster Scruggs – Music and lyrics by David Rawlings and Gillian Welch
|-
| style="vertical-align:top; width:50%;"|

 Bohemian Rhapsody – John Warhurst and Nina Hartstone
 Black Panther – Benjamin A. Burtt and Steve Boeddeker
 First Man – Ai-Ling Lee and Mildred Iatrou Morgan
 A Quiet Place – Ethan Van der Ryn and Erik Aadahl
 Roma – Sergio Díaz and Skip Lievsay
| style="vertical-align:top; width:50%;"|

 Bohemian Rhapsody – Paul Massey, Tim Cavagin and John Casali
 Black Panther – Steve Boeddeker, Brandon Proctor and Peter J. Devlin
 First Man – Jon Taylor, Frank A. Montaño, Ai-Ling Lee and Mary H. Ellis
 Roma – Skip Lievsay, Craig Henighan and José Antonio García
 A Star Is Born – Tom Ozanich, Dean Zupancic, Jason Ruder and Steve Morrow
|-
| style="vertical-align:top; width:50%;"|

 Black Panther – Production Design: Hannah Beachler; Set Decoration: Jay Hart The Favourite – Production Design: Fiona Crombie; Set Decoration: Alice Felton
 First Man – Production Design: Nathan Crowley; Set Decoration: Kathy Lucas
 Mary Poppins Returns – Production Design: John Myhre; Set Decoration: Gordon Sim
 Roma – Production Design: Eugenio Caballero; Set Decoration: Bárbara Enríquez

| style="vertical-align:top; width:50%;"|

 Roma – Alfonso Cuarón Cold War – Łukasz Żal
 The Favourite – Robbie Ryan
 Never Look Away – Caleb Deschanel
 A Star Is Born – Matthew Libatique
|-
| style="vertical-align:top; width:50%;"|

 Vice – Greg Cannom, Kate Biscoe and Patricia Dehaney Border – Göran Lundström and Pamela Goldammer
 Mary Queen of Scots – Jenny Shircore, Marc Pilcher and Jessica Brooks
| style="vertical-align:top; width:50%;"|

 Black Panther – Ruth E. Carter The Ballad of Buster Scruggs – Mary Zophres
 The Favourite – Sandy Powell
 Mary Poppins Returns – Sandy Powell
 Mary Queen of Scots – Alexandra Byrne
|-
| style="vertical-align:top; width:50%;" |

 Bohemian Rhapsody – John Ottman BlacKkKlansman – Barry Alexander Brown
 The Favourite – Yorgos Mavropsaridis
 Green Book – Patrick J. Don Vito
 Vice – Hank Corwin
| style="vertical-align:top; width:50%;" |

 First Man'' – Paul Lambert, Ian Hunter, Tristan Myles and J. D. Schwalm
 Avengers: Infinity War – Dan DeLeeuw, Kelly Port, Russell Earl and Dan Sudick
 Christopher Robin – Christopher Lawrence, Michael Eames, Theo Jones and Chris Corbould
 Ready Player One – Roger Guyett, Grady Cofer, Matthew E. Butler and David Shirk
 Solo: A Star Wars Story – Rob Bredow, Patrick Tubach, Neal Scanlan and Dominic Tuohy
|}

 Governors Awards 
The Academy held its 10th annual Governors Awards ceremony on November 18, 2018, where the following awards were presented:

Academy Honorary Awards
 Marvin Levy  "For an exemplary career in publicity that has brought films to the minds, hearts and souls of audiences all over the world"
 Lalo Schifrin  "In recognition of his unique musical style, compositional integrity and influential contributions to the art of film scoring"
 Cicely Tyson  "Whose unforgettable performances and personal integrity have inspired generations of filmmakers, actors and audiences"

Irving G. Thalberg Memorial Award
The award honors "creative producers whose bodies of work reflect a consistently high quality of motion picture production".

 Kathleen Kennedy
 Frank Marshall

Films with multiple nominations and awards

 Presenters and performers 
The following individuals, listed in order of appearance, presented awards or performed musical numbers.

Presenters

 Performers 

 Ceremony information 
In October 2018, the Academy hired film producer Donna Gigliotti and television producer Glenn Weiss to oversee production of the 2019 ceremony. "Donna and Glenn will infuse new energy and vision into this 91st awards presentation, and we are excited about a broad-based creative relationship with these two artists", Academy President John Bailey said in a press release announcing the decision. Furthermore, AMPAS CEO Dawn Hudson added, "We're thrilled to work with someone as passionate about the Academy as Donna Gigliotti — an Oscar winner and multiple nominee. She and the now-famous Glenn Weiss are committed to making the most of the innovations we've embraced for our 91st Oscars." In response, co-producer Gigliotti expressed gratitude saying, "I'm grateful to the Academy and ABC for entrusting me with this very special opportunity. I'm sure it will prove to be a humbling, exhilarating and completely unique experience. Thankfully, I will have Glenn Weiss by my side every step of the way!" Weiss also released a statement which read, "I'm so looking forward to being back to help celebrate and honor the film industry and all the talented people behind this year's movies. And I am 'co-excited' to be co-producing this year's show with Donna Gigliotti!"

Two months later, Gigliotti and Weiss initially selected actor and comedian Kevin Hart to host the ceremony. However, he resigned from his position shortly after his selection after it was revealed that Hart made jokes that contained anti-gay slurs and language. He also added he did not want to be a "distraction" to the ceremony in light of the controversy. The following February, broadcaster ABC Entertainment chief Karey Burke announced that the festivities would proceed without a host. During an interview at the Television Critics Association press tour, Burke stated, "The main goal, which I was told, was the Academy promised ABC last year after a very lengthy telecast to keep the show to three hours. Producers wisely decided to not to have a host and to go back to having the presenters and movies be the stars, and that be the best way to keep the show at a brisk three hours."

Other people participated in the production of the ceremony. Production designer David Korins designed a new stage for the show. Randy Thomas served as announcer for the ceremony. Musician Rickey Minor was hired as music director and conductor. Queen + Adam Lambert performed a medley of the songs "We Will Rock You" and "We Are the Champions" as part of the program's opening number.

Proposed "Popular Film" category
Due to the declining viewership of the recent Academy Awards ceremonies, AMPAS sought new ideas to revamp the show while renewing interest with the nominated films. In August 2018, the organization announced plans to add a new category honoring achievement in "Popular Film". The proposal was met with criticism because the award's implied focus on blockbuster suggested that artistic films and other non-mainstream pictures were not "popular with audiences". Furthermore, many viewed the creation of this new category to be a ploy to boost ratings and that it could hamper critically successful mainstream films from being nominated for Best Picture despite the insistence of AMPAS that such movies could be eligible for both categories. In light of the backlash, the Academy announced the following month that it would postpone implementation of the new category in order to seek additional input. AMPAS president John Bailey later admitted that the proposed category was intended to help improve viewership, and noted that the concept of a separate award for commercial film dates back to the inaugural awards ceremony, which had separate categories for "Outstanding Picture" and "Best Unique and Artistic Picture".

Unsuccessful efforts to shorten the ceremony
In an effort to shorten the ceremony, it was reported that only two of the nominees for Best Original Song, "All the Stars" and "Shallow", would be performed live. After a negative reaction from audiences and industry musicians, including Lin-Manuel Miranda and members of the music branch, the Academy backtracked and announced that all five Best Original Song nominees would be performed during the ceremony. "All the Stars" would not be performed, however, with Variety reporting that there were "logistics and timing issues" with its performers.

On February 11, AMPAS announced that the presentation of four awards categories, Best Cinematography, Best Live Action Short Film, Best Film Editing, and Best Makeup and Hairstyling, would occur during commercial breaks. They said that these presentations would be streamed so viewers could watch them live online, and that the winners' acceptance speeches would be replayed later in the broadcast. The decision received extensive backlash from audiences, and from filmmakers including Guillermo del Toro, Christopher Nolan, Martin Scorsese, Quentin Tarantino, Damien Chazelle, Spike Lee, Joe Dante and Alfonso Cuarón (the latter of whom was nominated and won in one of the aforementioned categories). Four days later, the Academy reversed the decision and announced that all 24 categories would be presented live.

Box office performance of Best Picture nominees
When the nominations were announced, seven of the eight films nominated for Best Picture had earned a combined gross of $1.26 billion at the American and Canadian box offices at the time. Black Panther was the highest-grossing film among the Best Picture nominees with $700 million in domestic box office receipts. A Star is Born came in second with $204.8 million; this was followed by Bohemian Rhapsody ($202.4 million), BlacKkKlansman ($48.5 million), Green Book ($42.3 million), Vice ($39.5 million), and The Favourite ($23 million). Box office figures for Roma were unavailable due to distributor Netflix's policy of refusing to release such figures.

Critical reviews and ratings
Some media outlets received the broadcast positively. Chuck Barney of The Mercury News commented, "After months of bad buzz and embarrassing missteps, the 91st Academy Awards appeared to be on their way to an epic fail." He also remarked, "The show, as usual, had some rocky moments, but overall it was a lively, well-paced and entertaining affair." Television critic Matthew Gilbert of The Boston Globe wrote, "The hostless Oscar ceremony felt a little more streamlined and energetic than usual, as we were spared yet another predictable opening goof on the nominated movies, a monologue pretending to make fun of the stars, and short quips across the night that never quite land." The Hollywood Reporter television critic Daniel Fienberg quipped, "Sunday's Oscars telecast definitely confirmed that under the right circumstances, a host isn't a necessity." In addition, he said, "The show was not overwhelmed by montages or stunts or tributes, and it also wasn't weighed down by elaborately prepared presenter schtick."

Others were more critical of the show. Kelly Lawler of USA Today wrote, "The 2019 Oscar telecast lacked energy and comedy, and was treacherously dull. And maybe that could have been avoided if the Academy had done what it has (almost) always done, and procured a host." She also observed that the awards "were more like a press conference with movie clips in the middle". Television critic Hank Stuever of The Washington Post commented, "They kept all the speeches but lost any trace of the unpredictable magic. They opened with Queen (the actual band, fronted by their usual Freddie Mercury replacement, Adam Lambert) and a promise that 'We Will Rock You,' but we all know better. The Oscar telecast has never rocked anyone." He ended his review stating, "It's painful, year after year, to watch show business struggle to find a better way to put on a satisfying show."

The American telecast on ABC drew in an average of 29.56 million people over its length, which was a 12% increase from the previous year's ceremony. The show also earned higher Nielsen ratings compared to the previous ceremony with 16.4% of households watching the ceremony. In addition, it garnered a higher 18–49 demo rating with a 7.7 rating among viewers in that demographic.

 "In Memoriam" 
The annual "In Memoriam" segment was presented by Academy president John Bailey. The Los Angeles Philharmonic led by conductor Gustavo Dudamel performed an excerpt of "Leaving Home" from Superman by John Williams during the montage. 

 Susan Anspach – actress
 Ermanno Olmi – director, writer
 Richard Greenberg – title designer, visual effects
 John N. Carter – film editor
 John Morris – composer
 Bernardo Bertolucci – director, writer
 Michel Legrand – composer
 Margot Kidder – actress
 Alixe Gordin – casting director
 Neil Simon – writer
 Richard H. Kline – cinematographer
 Vittorio Taviani – director, writer
 Elizabeth Sung – actress
 Françoise Bonnot – film editor
 Burt Reynolds – actor, director
 Kitty O'Neil – stunt performer
 Pablo Ferro – title designer, graphic artist
 Samuel Hadida – producer, distributor, executive
 Raymond Chow – producer, executive
 Pierre Rissient – festival selector, publicist, distributor, producer
 Anne V. Coates – film editor
 Paul Bloch – publicist
 Shinobu Hashimoto – writer
 Richard Marks – film editor
 Stéphane Audran – actress
 Robby Müller – cinematographer
 Craig Zadan – producer
 Barbara Harris – actress
 Claude Lanzmann – documentarian, director
 Martin Bregman – producer, manager
 Nelson Pereira dos Santos – director
 Will Vinton – animator
 Miloš Forman – director
 Witold Sobociński – cinematographer
 Daniel C. Striepeke – make-up artist
 Penny Marshall – director, producer, actress
 Isao Takahata – animation director
 Stephen Vaughan – still photographer
 Stan Lee – comic book writer, executive producer
 William Goldman – writer
 John M. Dwyer – set decorator
 Tab Hunter – actor
 Yvonne Blake – costume designer
 Nicolas Roeg – director, cinematographer
 James Karen – actor
 Gregg Rudloff – sound mixer
 Gloria Katz – writer, producer
 Bruno Ganz – actor
 Audrey Wells – writer, director
 Albert Finney – actor

 See also 
 List of submissions to the 91st Academy Awards for Best Foreign Language Film

 References 

 External links 

Official websites

 
 
 91st Annual Academy Awards of Merit for Achievements During 2018  91st Oscars Rules
 Oscar's Channel at YouTube (run by the Academy of Motion Picture Arts and Sciences)

News resources
 Oscars 2018 at BBC News
 Oscars 2019 at The Guardian''

Other resources

2019 awards in the United States
2018 film awards
2019 in Los Angeles
Academy Awards ceremonies
February 2019 events in the United States
Television shows directed by Glenn Weiss